Carson is an unincorporated community located in Gallatin County, Kentucky, United States. It was also known as Bramelette.

References

Unincorporated communities in Gallatin County, Kentucky
Unincorporated communities in Kentucky